Jaime Bermúdez Merizalde (born c. 1966) is a Colombian lawyer and diplomat who served as Minister of Foreign Affairs of Colombia from 2008 to 2010.

Career
Jaime Bermúdez graduated from Gimnasio de los Cerros in 1983. He attended University of the Andes, and graduated in Law in 1992. He later obtained a Chevening Scholarship to study for a DPhil degree from St Antony's College, Oxford.

Between 1991 and 1993, Jaime Bermúdez was adviser to the Colombian government's Consejería de Derechos Humanos (Human Rights Committee) and the Minister of Foreign Affairs. Between 1993 and 1994 he was coordinator of the "Good Neighbors Commission". In 1994 he was a UN-appointed observer of the presidential elections in South Africa. In 1996 was executive director of the Consorcio Iberoamericano de Investigaciones de Mercado, CIMA.

Between 2002 and 2006, Bermúdez was a communications adviser to President Álvaro Uribe whom he met around 1998 while they were both students at Oxford University. He was then named as Colombian ambassador to Argentina, a position that he held from August 26, 2006 to July 9, 2008.

Publications
As a member of the "Good Neighbors Commission", Bermúdez edited the book Colombia–Venezuela, un nuevo esquema bilateral (Colombia–Venezuela, A New Bilateral Framework). Together with Cynthia Arnson, he collaborated on the report "Los procesos de paz en Colombia: Múltiples negociaciones, múltiples actores" ("The Peace Process in Colombia: Multiple Negotiations, Multiple Actors").

Bermúdez has been a contributor to the Colombian publications Estrategia y Economía and Revista Diners.

References

External links
 "Jaime Bermúdez Sería El Nuevo Canciller". El Tiempo. (June 9, 2008)
 "Foreign Minister Araújo resigns". Colombia reports. (July 16, 2008)
 "Jaime Bermúdez asume este jueves como nuevo Canciller de Colombia" Secretaria de Prensa, Presidencia de la Republica. July 17, 2008
 "Un abogado cercano a Uribe" ABC.
 Interview for Argentinian TV
 Designation ceremony

1966 births
Living people
People from Bogotá
20th-century Colombian lawyers
Foreign ministers of Colombia
Ambassadors of Colombia to Argentina
Alumni of St Antony's College, Oxford
University of Los Andes (Colombia) alumni
Chevening Scholars